Streamliner Coaster is  a junior roller coaster located at Six Flags Fiesta Texas in San Antonio, Texas. Designed by Vekoma, a Dutch manufacture, the coaster is one of the few original attractions that opened with the park.

Riders board a 10-seater train and go up a short hill before going down and following the track in a simple loop back round to the station in two circuits.

History
Streamliner Coaster was originally named Pied Piper when it opened on March 14, 1992, with the park. In 1999, the roller coaster was renamed to Rollschuhcoaster, when Six Flags came as sole owners of the park.

In 2007, Six Flags released new entertainment and marketing initiatives for their US based parks, such as bringing Wiggles into their lineup. On September 28, 2008, Six Flags Fiesta Texas announced the expansion of Wiggles World, that would enhance the line up for family-oriented rides. Kiddie Koaster was part of the expansion as the ride got refurbished with a new name, Romp Bomp A Stomp to go along with the theming of the new area.  

In November 2010, the company began the process of canceling licensed intellectual property deals they had with various brands including what they had with the Wiggles as the company was emerging itself from bankruptcy at that time. This affected the roller coaster in which, it was renamed in late 2010 as Kiddie Koaster. Ten years later in 2020, the roller coaster went through its fifth name change, to Streamliner Coaster.

References

Junior roller coasters
Roller coasters introduced in 1992
Roller coasters operated by Six Flags
Six Flags Fiesta Texas
Roller coasters in Texas